Critical incident stress management (CISM) was a controversial, non-empirical, adaptive, short-term psychological helping-process that focused solely on an immediate and identifiable problem.  It included pre-incident preparedness to acute crisis management through post-crisis follow-up. Its purpose was to enable people to return to their daily routine more quickly and with less likelihood of experiencing post-traumatic stress disorder (PTSD).  However, after researchers linked the debriefing techniques used in CISM to increased rates of PTSD, CISM is now seldom used and has largely been replaced with immediate psychological care techniques that do not use debriefing such as those endorsed by the CDC, Red Cross, WHO, American Psychological Association and National Center for Post Traumatic Stress Disorder (NC-PTSD).  Responsible practioners who still use CISM must eliminate debriefing steps in order to remain compliant with best practices and clinical guidelines. 

CISM was widely discredited, has not been practiced by licensed mental health professionals, and was expressly rejected by the US Government in 2002.  Recent evidence-based reviews have concluded that CISM is ineffective and sometimes harmful for both primary and secondary victims, such as responding emergency services personnel.  CISM was never intended to treat primary victims of trauma.  An analysis of the psychological debriefing method used in CISM linked it to increased rates of PTSD one year after an event.  As of 2022, peer reviewed meta-analysis specifically warn against the clinical use of CISM for all patients, primary or secondary, stating, "clinical guidelines for managing post-traumatic stress recommend not to practice psychological debriefing".

Purpose
CISM was designed to help people deal with their trauma one incident at a time, by allowing them to talk about the incident when it happens without judgment or criticism. The program was peer-driven (often by those with less than a week of training - and no formal mental health or counseling training or credentials) and the people conducting the interventions may have come from all walks of life, but most were first responders (Police, Fire, emergency medical services) or work in the mental health field. A major CISM training source appears to deliberately legally distance themselves from the training they provide by issuing a "certificate of attendance" and specifically stating:  "We do not offer a certificate that specifically states you are CISD/CISM trained." Another training source that does offer certificates also legally distances themselves from their own training, stating that they do "not represent, warrant or guaranty that the certificant is properly prepared or equipped to perform CISM or any of its components". All interventions are strictly confidential, the only caveat to this is if the person doing the intervention determines that the person being helped is a danger to themselves or to others. The emphasis was always on keeping people safe and returning them quickly to more normal levels of functioning.

Normal is different for everyone, and it is not easy to quantify. Critical incidents raise stress levels dramatically in a short period of time and after treatment a new normal is established, however, it is always higher than the old level. The purpose of the intervention process is to establish or set the new normal stress levels as low as possible.

Recipients
Critical incidents are traumatic events that cause powerful emotional reactions in people who are exposed to those events.  The most stressful of these are line of duty deaths, co-worker suicide, multiple event incidents, delayed intervention and multi-casualty incidents.  Every profession can list their own worst-case scenarios that can be categorized as critical incidents. Emergency services organizations, for example, usually list the Terrible Ten. They are:
 Line of duty deaths
 Suicide of a colleague
 Serious work related injury
 Multi-casualty / disaster / terrorism incidents
 Events with a high degree of threat to the personnel
 Significant events involving children
 Events in which the victim is known to the personnel
 Events with excessive media interest
 Events that are prolonged and end with a negative outcome
 Any significantly powerful, overwhelming distressing event

While any person may experience a critical incident, conventional wisdom says that members of law enforcement, fire fighting units, and emergency medical services are at great risk for post-traumatic stress disorder (PTSD). However, less than 5% of emergency services personnel will develop long-term PTSD symptomatology. That percentage increases when responders endure the death of a co-worker in the line of duty.  This rate is only slightly higher than the general population average of 3–4%, which indicates that despite the remarkably high levels of exposure to trauma, emergency workers are resilient, and people who join the field may self-select for emotional resilience.  Emergency responders tend to portray themselves as "tough”, professional, and unemotional about their work. They often find comfort with other responders, and believe that their families and friends in other professions are unable to completely understand their experiences. Humor is used as a defense mechanism. Alcohol or possibly other drugs/medications may be used to self-medicate in "worst case" situations.

Types of intervention
The type of intervention used depended on the situation, the number of people involved, and their proximity to the event. One form of intervention was a three-step approach, whereas different approaches include as many as five stages. However, the exact number of steps is not what is important for the intervention's success. The goal of the intervention is to address the trauma along the general progression: defusing, debriefing, and followup.

Defusing
A defusing was done the day of the incident before the person(s) had a chance to sleep. The defusing was designed to assure the person or people involved that their feelings are normal, to tell them what symptoms to watch for over the short term, and to offer them a lifeline in the form of a telephone number where they can reach someone whom they can talk to. Defusings were limited only to individuals directly involved in the incident and were often done informally, sometimes at the scene. They were designed to assist individuals in coping in the short term and address immediate needs.

Debriefing
(Warning of potential harm:  Debriefing is controversial and there is empirical evidence that it may cause harm.  Those considering adopting a psychological intervention strategy should strongly consider allowing only licensed medical or mental health counselors to engage in any debriefing-like intervention vs. "certified" counselors who are not licensed medical professionals.  Individuals trained by CISM businesses/programs often have less than a week of training and are not mental health professionals, are not subject to oversight, are not subject to licensing and are not required to abide by ethics programs.  CISM training providers often go out of their way to legally distance themselves from the consequences of their own training.)

Debriefings were usually the second level of intervention for those directly affected by the incident and often the first for those not directly involved.

A debriefing was normally done within 72 hours of the incident and gives the individual or group the opportunity to talk about their experience, how it has affected them, brainstorm coping mechanisms, identify individuals at risk, and inform the individual or group about services available to them in their community. The final step was to follow up with them the day after the debriefing to ensure that they are safe and coping well or to refer the individual for professional counselling.

Although many co-opted the debriefing process for use with other groups, the primary focus in the field of CISM was to support staff members of organizations or members of communities which have experienced a traumatic event. The debriefing process (defined by the International Critical Incident Stress Foundation [ICISF]) had seven steps: introduction of intervenor and establishment of guidelines and invites participants to introduce themselves (while attendance at a debriefing may be mandatory, participation is not); details of the event given from individual perspectives; emotional responses given subjectively; personal reaction and actions; followed again by a discussion of symptoms exhibited since the event; instruction phase where the team discusses the symptoms and assures participants that any symptoms (if they have any at all) are a normal reaction to an abnormal event and "generally" these symptoms will diminish with time and self-care; following a brief period of shared informal discussion (generally over a beverage and treat) resumption of duty where individuals are returned to their normal tasks. The intervenor is always watching for individuals who are not coping well and additional assistance is offered at the conclusion of the process.

There is peer-reviewed evidence that CISM-like recounting of the "details of the event given from individual perspectives" can cause psychological harm through re-telling/re-exposure to the traumatic event with additional details, and the potential creation of consequential false memories.  Through this step it is possible for a CISM counselor to re-traumatize and potentially provide a basis for ASD or PTSD that may not have otherwise occurred.  Studies have shown that debriefing increases the rate of PTSD one year after an event.  This discussion of "details of the event given from individual perspectives" is the single most controversial and potentially dangerous aspect of CISM and should not be undertaken by anyone but a licensed medical professional.  Due to the real potential for harm, this should not be attempted by non-licensed "counselors" who have attended a commercial CISM course.

Follow-up
The important final step is follow-up. This was generally done within the week following the debriefing by team members as a check-in.

Research

The overwhelming preponderance of peer reviewed, published research found that CISM was ineffective and/or harmful. Several meta-analyses in the medical literature either found no preventative benefit of CISM, very low quality evidence of benefit, or negative impact for those debriefed.  Research evidence linking debriefing to harm had been identified as early as 2002 where Rose Et. al identified increased rates of PTSD one year after a psychological debriefing like those used in CISM leading to a rejection of the practice of debriefing by many US Government Agencies that year under the medical ethical principle of "do no harm". Twenty years later, the evidence against CISM/debriefing had strengthened with a January 2022 peer-reviewed evidence synthesis stating, "current evidence is consistent in not endorsing it as a form of treatment or prevention of post-traumatic symptomatology", "clinical guidelines for managing post-traumatic stress recommend not to practice psychological debriefing" and "psychological debriefing and associated interventions should be avoided in the management of acute trauma".

See also 
 Clinical psychology
 Incident stress
 Stress management
 Stress (medicine)

References 

Anxiety disorders
Psychological stress